Madeline Zima (born September 16, 1985) is an American actress. She portrayed Grace Sheffield on the CBS sitcom The Nanny (1993–1999), Mia Lewis on the Showtime comedy drama series Californication (2007–2011), and Gretchen Berg on the NBC series Heroes (2009–2010).

Early life
Zima was born in New Haven, Connecticut, the daughter of Marie and Dennis. Her surname means "winter" in Polish and comes from her maternal grandfather, who was of Polish descent. Zima has two younger sisters, Vanessa and Yvonne, both of whom are also actresses.

Career
Zima began her career when she was two years old with an appearance in a television commercial for Downy fabric softener. From 1993 to 1999 she played the role of Grace Sheffield on the television show The Nanny throughout its six seasons. Zima, then aged 22, played Mia Lewis on the first two seasons of the series Californication and overall appeared in the series from 2007 to 2011. In promotion of the fictional book her character wrote, Fucking & Punching, Zima starred in several Californication webisodes featured on YouTube. Zima has also become known for her work in films such as The Hand That Rocks the Cradle, A Cinderella Story, Dimples, Looking for Sunday, Once in a Very Blue Moon, Legacy and The Collector. 

From 2009 to 2010, Zima joined the cast of Heroes as Gretchen Berg, Claire Bennet's quirky bisexual roommate and tentative love interest. Zima appeared as a guest star on several television shows, including Law & Order, JAG, and Touched by an Angel. She also guest starred in an episode of The Vampire Diaries, and in two episodes of the 2017 Twin Peaks The Return. In 2012, she was cast in a co-starring role in the ABC drama pilot Gilded Lilys, but the series was not picked up by ABC. Zima starred in The Blondes (2019), a scripted podcast series, with her sister Yvonne. In 2020, she appeared in HBO's Perry Mason. In 2021, Zima appeared in NCIS: Hawaiʻis fifth episode "Gaijin" as suspect Abby Nelson. In 2023, she joined Megan Fox in S.K. Dale's upcoming sci-fi thriller Subservience.

Filmography

Film

Television

Awards and nominations
Zima was nominated three times for a YoungStar Award, in 1995, 1997 and 1999, all for Best Performance by a Young Actress in a Comedy TV Series for The Nanny.

She was also nominated 13 times for a Young Artist Award: 
 1993 – Best Young Actress Under Ten in a Motion Picture for The Hand That Rocks the Cradle
 1994 – Best Youth Actress Leading Role in a Motion Picture Comedy and for Outstanding Youth Ensemble in a Television Series, shared with Benjamin Salisbury and Nicholle Tom, both for The Nanny
 1995 – Best Performance by a Youth Actress as a TV Guest Star for Law & Order, and Best Performance by a Youth Ensemble in a Television Series shared with Nicholle Tom and Benjamin Salisbury, Best Performance by an Actress Under Ten in a Motion Picture and Best Performance by an Actress Under Ten in a TV Series, all of them for The Nanny
 1996 – Best Performance by a Young Actress in a TV Comedy Series for The Nanny
 1998 – Best Performance in a TV Comedy Series by a Supporting Young Actress for The Nanny
 2001 – Best Performance in a TV Movie (Drama) by a Leading Young Actress for The Sandy Bottom Orchestra

References

External links
 

1985 births
20th-century American actresses
21st-century American actresses
American child actresses
American film actresses
American television actresses
Living people
American people of Polish descent
Actresses from New Haven, Connecticut